"More Questions Than Answers" is an episode of the BBC sitcom, The Green Green Grass. It was first screened on 20 October 2006, as the sixth episode of series two.

Synopsis

Llewellyn returns in this episode, challenging Boycie to a pub quiz whereby the loser will have to pay the winner a large sum of money, thanks to Elgin's constant bargaining on behalf of Boycie. The Boyces look set for a huge money loss when their team is nothing but Elgin, Byran and Jed. But when young Tyler turns up and answers all the 2nd-round questions right, Winterdown Farm looks like it is set to have a bright, rich and rewarding future.

Episode cast

References

British TV Comedy Guide for The Green Green Grass

External links

"More Questions Than Answers" at the British Comedy Guide

2006 British television episodes
The Green Green Grass episodes